The 1998 Indian Federation Cup, also known as 1998 Kalyani Black Label Federation Cup due to sponsorship reasons, was the 21st season of the Indian Federation Cup. It was held between 23 August and 12 September 1998. Salgaocar were the defending champions, but were eliminated in the first round by State Bank of Travancore. Mohun Bagan won the tournament for the tenth time, following a 2–1 over East Bengal in the final played at the Salt Lake Stadium, Kolkata, a replay of the previous edition's semifinal when the latter won. Amit Das and Hemanta Dora of Mohun Bagan were named the Player and Goalkeeper of the Tournament.

Qualification

For the 1998 edition, the All India Football Federation (AIFF) decided to increase the number of entries to justify the tournament as that "for champion clubs" on the back of two decades of "[failure] to achieve its propagated aims and objectives." Accordingly, on 16 July 1998, the President of AIFF, Priya Ranjan Dasmunsi, announced that the edition would have 48 teams competing. Eight teams would be seeded directly into the round of 16 and eight other teams would qualify from five zones: North, East, North-East, West and South. He added that the qualifying rounds would be played on a knock-out basis, and that top two teams from South Zone and the winners of the four other zones would qualify for the tournament proper, while the other two would come from a play-off among runners-up of the four zones. Salgaocar, East Bengal, Mohun Bagan, Mohammedan, Border Security Force, Indian Telephone Industries, Dempo and Churchill Brothers were announced as the eight seeded teams. A report carried by Sportstar said that the teams were seeded based on their quarter-final entry in the previous edition.

The qualification round saw 37 teams vying from five zones for the eight spots. A then newly formed club, Bengal Mumbai, was not allowed to enter the competition from the West Zone as, according to the AIFF, "the team would have to come through the state league and prove themselves."

Qualified teams

Results
In case of a tie at regular time, extra time with golden goal was used. In case scores remain tied even after extra time, penalty shoot-out was used.

Pre-quarterfinals (round of 16)

Quarter-finals

Semi-finals

Third place play-off

Final

Statistics

Goalscorers
4 goals

 Cyril Barreto (Churchill Brothers)

3 goals

 Renedy Singh (East Bengal)
 Raman Vijayan (East Bengal)
 Chima Okorie (Mohun Bagan)

2 goals

 Aqeel Ansari (Churchill Brothers)
 Philip Mensah (Churchill Brothers)
 Carlton Chapman (East Bengal)
 I. M. Vijayan (Mohun Bagan)

1 goal

 Gauranga Pal (Border Security Force)
 Harvinder Singh (Border Security Force)
 Mario Soares (Churchill Brothers)
 Elvis Fernandes (Churchill Brothers)
 Dipendu Biswas (East Bengal)
 Basudeb Mondal (East Bengal)
 Suraj Thapa (Jorba Durga)
 Cassius Owino (Mohammedan Sporting)
 Joy Kabui (Mohammedan Sporting)
 Sammy Omollo (Mohun Bagan)
 Gurdish Singh (Punjab State Electricity Board)
 Sylvester Ignatius (State Bank of Travancore)
 Premanand Gadekar (Vasco)
 Louis Nickson (Vasco)

Awards
Player of the Tournament Amit Das (Mohun Bagan)
Best Goalkeeper Hemanta Dora (Mohun Bagan)

Prize money
United Breweries Group sponsored the tournament and announced a prize money of 2 million for the winning team. The team that came second, third and fourth were given 1.5 million, 1 million and 500,000 respectively. All the other teams that participated in the 
tournament proper received 100,000 each.

References

External links
 1998–99 Federation Cup

Indian Federation Cup seasons
1998–99 domestic association football cups
1998–99 in Indian football